Hincha Gerya is a census town in Bhagabanpur I CD block in Egra subdivision of Purba Medinipur district in the state of West Bengal, India.

Geography

Location

Urbanisation
96.96% of the population of Egra subdivision live in the rural areas. Only 3.04% of the population live in the urban areas, and that is the lowest proportion of urban population amongst the four subdivisions in Purba Medinipur district.

Note: The map alongside presents some of the notable locations in the subdivision. All places marked in the map are linked in the larger full screen map.

Demographics
As per 2011 Census of India Hincha Gerya had a total population of 4,958 of which 2,464 (50%) were males and 2,394 (48%) were females. Population below 6 years was 771. The total number of literates in Hincha Gerya was 3,478 (83.07% of the population over 6 years).

Infrastructure
As per the District Census Handbook 2011, Hincha Gerya covered an area of 2.0266 km2. Deshapran railway station is located 3 km away and bus routes at Kismat Bajkul 3 km away. Amongst the civic amenities it had 450 domestic electric connections. Amongst the medical facilities it had a hospital 9 km away. Amongst the educational facilities it had were 2 primary schools. The nearest middle school was at Narayandai 1.5 km away. The secondary school and senior secondary school were at Kajlagarh 3 km away. The nearest degree college was at Kismat Bajkul 3 km away.

Transport
Local roads link Hincha Gerya to Egra-Bajkul Road.

Education
Bajkul Milani Mahavidyalaya, established at Tethi Bari mouza, PO Kismat Bajkul, in 1964, is located close by.

Healthcare
Bhagabanpur Rural Hospital at Bhagabanpur (with 30 beds), the main medical facility in Bhagabanpur I CD block, is located not very far away.

References

Cities and towns in Purba Medinipur district